Boronia filifolia, commonly known as the slender boronia, is a plant in the citrus family Rutaceae and is endemic to south-eastern Australia. It is a slender shrub with simple or pinnate leaves and pale to deep pink four-petalled flowers.

Description
The stamens are covered with glandular hairs. Flowering occurs from July to February.

Taxonomy and naming
Boronia filifolia was first formally described in 1858 by Ferdinand von Mueller who published the description in  Fragmenta phytographiae Australiae from a specimen collected near Encounter Bay. The specific epithet (filifolia) is derived from the Latin words filum meaning "thread" and folia meaning "leaves" referring to the very narrow leaflets.

Distribution and habitat
Slender boronia grows in heath, mallee and woodland. In South Australia it is found on the Eyre and Fleurieu Peninsulas and is common on Kangaroo Island. It is rare in Victoria where it is only known in the Little Desert National Park and part of the Big Desert near the border with South Australia, with a disjunct population near Portland.

References 

filifolia
Flora of South Australia
Flora of Victoria (Australia)
Plants described in 1858
Taxa named by Ferdinand von Mueller